Tolpia mccabei is a moth of the family Erebidae first described by Michael Fibiger in 2007. It is known from Borneo.

The wingspan is about 13 mm. The forewing is rounded, very broad and dark brown. The hindwing is grey brown and the underside unicolorous dark brown.

References

Micronoctuini
Taxa named by Michael Fibiger
Moths described in 2007